Shane Bolks (born 25 December 1972), who writes under the pen name Shana Galen, is an American author of "chick lit" and historical romance novels.

Biography
Bolks was a secondary school teacher for over 11 years in Houston, Texas, before turning to writing full-time. She is a founding member of The Sisterhood of the Jaunty Quills and writes blogs on its website. She is a member of the Romance Writers of America. Her brand is Let the Games Begin.

Bolks has a B.A. in psychology from the University of Texas at Austin and a Master of Education from the University of Houston.

Her book, The Good, The Bad, and the Ugly Men I've Dated was a RITA award finalist for "Best First Book". Her first romance novel, which was eventually titled When Dashing Met Danger, finaled in the Romance Writers of America's 2004 Golden Heart competition. Blackthorne's Bride was a 2008 Rita award finalist for "Best Long Historical".

Bibliography

As Shane Bolks
She writes under her own name when she writes contemporary fiction.
The Good, The Bad, and the Ugly Men I've Dated (Avon, April 26, 2005) 
Reality TV Bites (Avon, June 27, 2006)

As Shana Galen
She uses the name Shana Galen for her historical romance books.
When Dashing Met Danger (Avon, April 26, 2005)- set in 1805 England. 
Pride and Petticoats (Avon, January 31, 2006) - set in 1813 England.

The Misadventures in Matrimony series
No Man's Bride (Avon, August 29, 2006) - set in Regency England. 
Good Groom Hunting (Avon, January 30, 2007) - set in 19th century England and the high seas. 
Blackthorne's Bride (Avon, November 1, 2007)

Sons of the Revolution
The Making of a Duchess (Sourcebooks Casablanca, June 2010). 
The Making of a Gentleman (Sourcebooks Casablanca, October 2010). 
The Rogue Pirates's Bride (Sourcebooks Casablanca, February 2012).

Regency Spy series
Lord and Lady Spy (Sourcebooks Casablanca,September 2011).

Jewels of the Ton
When You Give a Duke a Diamond (Sourcebooks Casablanca, September 2012). 
If You Give a Rake a Ruby (Sourcebooks Casablanca, March 2013). 
Sapphires Are an Earl's Best Friend (Sourcebooks Casablanca, March 2014).

The Survivors
Third Son's a Charm, Book 1 (Sourcebooks Casablanca, November 2017). 
No Earls Allowed, Book 2 (Sourcebooks Casablanca, March 2018). 
An Affair with a Spare, Book 3 (Sourcebooks Casablanca, July 2018). 
Unmask Me if You Can, Book 4. (Amazon Digital Services, September 2018). 
The Claiming of the Shrew, Book 5. (Amazon Digital Services, April 2019). 
A Duke a Dozen, Book 6. (Amazon Digital Services, September 2019). 
How the Lady was Won, Book 7. (Amazon Digital Services, February 2020). 
Kisses and Scandal, Book 7.5. (Amazon Digital Services, April 2020). 
The Highlander's Excellent Adventure, Book 8. (Amazon Digital Services, September 2020).

References

External links
Shana Galen' official website
Shana Galen' official blog on the Jaunty Quills website

1972 births
21st-century American novelists
21st-century American women writers
American chick lit writers
American romantic fiction writers
American women novelists
Living people
University of Houston alumni
University of Texas at Austin College of Liberal Arts alumni
Women historical novelists
Women romantic fiction writers
Writers of historical romances